March is a surname. Notable people with the surname include:

A
 Aaron March (born 1986), Italian alpine snowboarder
 Alden March (1795–1869), American physician and surgeon
 Aleida March (born 1936), Cuban revolutionary and wife of Che Guevara
 April March (born 1965), American singer-songwriter
 Arnau March, Provenço-Catalan knight and poet
 Arthur March (1891–1957), Austrian physicist
 Ausiàs March ( – 1459), Valencian poet in the Catalan language

B
 Babette March (born 1941), German-American model and chef
 Barbara March (1953–2019), Canadian movie actress
 Barbara Joan March (born 1945), American criminal from Connecticut
 Billy March (1925–1974), English footballer

C
 Charles Gordon-Lennox, Earl of March and Kinrara (born 1955), British peer
 Charles March-Phillipps (1779–1862), British Whig politician
 Chris March (1963–2019), American fashion and costume designer

D
 David March (born 1979), English rugby league footballer, twin brother of Paul March

E
 Elsie March (1884–1974), English sculptor, sister of Sydney and Vernon March
 Elspeth March (1911–1999), English actress

F
 Forbes March (born 1973), British-born Canadian actor
 Francis March (1825–1911), American academic, philologist, and lexicographer
 Frederick Hamilton March (1891–1977), Australian soldier
 Fredric March (1897–1975), American actor

G
 Gary March, Australian investor and president of the Richmond Football Club
 George March (1932–2017), former English cricketer
 Gus March-Phillipps (1908–1942), British soldier

H
 Hal March (1920–1970) Jewish-American comedian and actor
 Harry March (1875–1940), American football historian
 Henry March (1863–1917), Canadian physician and politician in Nova Scotia

J
 Jack March, American tennis player and promoter
 James G. March (1928–2018), American psychologist and sociologist
 Janet March (1963–1996), American children's book illustrator and murder victim
 Jane March (born 1973), British actress and model
 Jaume March II ( – 1410), Catalan poet
 Jerry March, Ph.D. (1929–1997), American chemist and author of March's Advanced Organic Chemistry
 Jill March, pseudonym of American author Nora Roberts (born 1950)
 Jim March (born 1954), Scottish footballer
 Joe March (born 1967), American arena football player
 John March (colonel) (1658–1712), Massachusetts businessman and soldier
 John March (barrister) ( – 1657), English barrister and legal writer
 Juan Antonio March Pujol (born 1958), Spanish diplomat
 Juan March Ordinas (1880–1962), Spanish businessman
 Justin March-Lillard (born 1993), American football linebacker

K
 Kevin March (businessman), American business executive
 Kevin March (musician), American drummer, record producer and songwriter

L
 Lionel March (1934–2018), British mathematician, architect and digital artist
 Liska March (1906–2003), American dancer, actress and producer
 Lori March (1923–2013), American actress

M
 Mush March (1908–2002), Canadian ice hockey player

N
 Nimmy March (born 1962), English television actress.

O
 Otto March (1845–1913), German architect, father of Werner and Walter

P
 Paul March (born 1979), English rugby league footballer and coach, twin brother of David March
 Peggy March (born 1948), American pop music singer
 Perry March, (born 1961) American lawyer and convicted murderer.
 Peyton Conway March (1864–1955), American general
 Peyton C. March, Jr. (1896–1914), American military pilot
 Pere March ( – 1413), Catalan poet

R
 Robert March (1928–2010), Australian of East Asian business practices.
 Rosalind March, British actress

S
 Samuel March (1861–1935), British Labour politician
 Solly March (born 1994), English footballer
 Stan March (born 1938), English footballer
 Stella March (1916–2010), British writer of romance novels
 Stephanie March (born 1974), American television actress
 Stephen March (died 1880), Newfoundland politician, father of Stephen Rendell
 Stephen Rendell March (1851–1935), Newfoundland merchant and politician, son of Stephen
 Steve March-Tormé (born 1953), an American singer and songwriter
 Susana March (1918–1990), Spanish writer and poet 
 Sydney March (1876–1968), English sculptor, brother of Elsie and Vernon March

V
 Vernon March (1891–1930), English sculptor, brother of Elsie March and Sydney March
 Vicente March (1859–1927), Spanish painter

W
 Walter March (1898–1969), German architect, son of Otto and brother of Werner
 Werner March (1894–1976), German architect, son of Otto and brother of Walter
 William March (1893–1954), American author and novelist

Fictional characters
 Amy, Beth, Jo, and Meg March, characters in Little Women by Louisa May Alcott
 Audrey and Lucille March, characters in the American soap opera General Hospital
 Colonel March, fictional detective created by John Dickson Carr
 Vivien March, character in BBC soap opera Doctors
 Zosia March, character from BBC medical drama Holby City

See also
 March (disambiguation)
 Marche (disambiguation)